ELAN is computer software, a professional tool to manually and semi-automatically annotate and transcribe audio or video recordings. It has a tier-based data model that supports multi-level, multi-participant annotation of time-based media. It is applied in humanities and social sciences research (language documentation, sign language and gesture research) for the purpose of documentation and of qualitative and quantitative analysis. It is distributed as free and open source software under the GNU General Public License, version 3.

ELAN is a well established professional-grade software and is widely used in academia. It has been well received in several academic disciplines, for example, in psychology, medicine, psychiatry, education, and behavioral studies, on topics such as human computer interaction, sign language  and conversation analysis, group interactions, music therapy, bilingualism and child language acquisition, analysis of non-verbal communication and gesture analysis, and animal behavior.

Several third-party tools have been developed to enrich and analyse ELAN data and corpora.

Features
Its features include:
 Manual and semi-automatic segmentation and annotation
 Transcription and translation of speech
 Tier hierarchies
 Support for multiple media sources
 Use of controlled vocabularies
 Complex search 
 XML-based data format

History
ELAN is developed by the Max Planck Institute for Psycholinguistics in Nijmegen. The first version was released around the year 2000 under the name EAT, Eudico Annotation Tool. It was renamed to ELAN in 2002. Since then, two to three new versions are released each year. It is developed in the programming language Java with interfaces to platform native media frameworks developed in C, C++, and Objective-C.

See also
 Computer-assisted qualitative data analysis software
 Language documentation
 Language documentation tools and methods

References

Notes 
 Crasborn, O., Sloetjes, H. (2008). Enhanced ELAN functionality for sign language corpora. In: Proceedings of LREC 2008, Sixth International Conference on Language Resources and Evaluation.

External links

 ELAN third party resources (Templates, Scripts, Tools, Workflow descriptions, HowTos)
 Manuals:
 Hellwig, B. (2017): ELAN – Linguistic Annotator (Manual)
 RedHenLab (2016). How to annotate with ELAN (Tutorial)
 Rosenfelder, I. (2011): A Short Introduction to Transcribing with ELAN
 Colletta J.M. (2009): Coding manual – Multimodal Data Transcription and Annotation with ELAN

Transcription (linguistics)
Linguistic research software
Free QDA software
Cross-platform free software
Science software for macOS
Science software for Linux